Luigi Lavitrano (7 March 1874 – 2 August 1950) was an Italian cardinal of the Catholic Church who served as Archbishop of Palermo from 1928 to 1944, and as prefect of the Sacred Congregation for Religious from 1945 until his death. Lavitrano was elevated to the cardinalate in 1929.

Biography
Born in Forio, Lavitrano lost his entire family in an earthquake in 1883 that devastated the island of Ischia. He studied at the Pontifical Urbaniana University, the Pontifical Roman Athenaeum S. Apollinare, the Royal University, and the Pontifical Leonine Institute in Rome. He was ordained to the priesthood on 21 March 1898, and then taught at the Leonine Institute until 1910, when he became its rector. He was raised to the rank of Privy Chamberlain of His Holiness on 8 March 1904.

On 25 May 1914, Lavitrano was appointed Bishop of Cava e Sarno by Pope Pius X. He received his episcopal consecration on the following 21 June from Basilio Cardinal Pompili, with Bishops Giovanni Regine and Giovanni Scotti serving as co-consecrators. Lavitrano was later named Archbishop of Benevento on 16 July 1924, and finally archbishop of Palermo on 29 September 1928. In addition, he served as Apostolic Administrator of Castellammare di Stabia from 1924 to 1925.

Pope Pius XI created him Cardinal-Priest of San Silvestro in Capite in the consistory of 16 December 1929. Lavitrano, who once scolded Italian Catholics for their religious negligence, was one of the cardinal electors who participated in the 1939 papal conclave that selected Pope Pius XII. After resigning as Palermo's archbishop in December 1944, he was made Prefect of the Sacred Congregation for Religious in the Roman Curia on 14 May 1945. Lavitrano's resignation was unexpected, and it is considered that he resigned because his alleged sympathy for the Fascists—he voted for the National Fascist Party in the 1929 Italian general elections—became unpopular.

Lavitrano died in Marino, in the Alban Hills, at age 76. He is buried in the basilica of Santa Maria di Loreto in his native Forio.

References

External links
Cardinals of the Holy Roman Church
Catholic-Hierarchy 

1874 births
1950 deaths
People from the Province of Naples
20th-century Italian cardinals
Roman Catholic archbishops of Palermo
Archbishops of Benevento
Members of the Congregation for Institutes of Consecrated Life and Societies of Apostolic Life
Pontifical Urban University alumni
20th-century Italian Roman Catholic archbishops